The gamelan salendro is a form of gamelan music found in West Java, Indonesia. It is played as an accompaniment to wayang golek (rod puppet) performances and dances. It uses a similar ensemble as a small central Javanese gamelan, but has developed differently, and shows the more exuberant character.

See also

 Gamelan
 Degung
 Angklung

References

Gamelan ensembles and genres
Sundanese music